The UK Payments Administration Ltd (UKPA) is a United Kingdom service company that provides people, facilities and expertise to the UK payments industry.

UKPA was created on 6 July 2009, as a successor of the Association for Payment Clearing Services (APACS) to support the systems behind UK payments, such as Bacs, CHAPS and the Cheque and Credit Clearing Company. APACS had been created in 1985 to oversee the majority of UK payment clearing systems and keep their operational efficiency and integrity in order. Theresa May is a former employee.

References

External links

Financial services companies established in 2009
Banking in the United Kingdom
Trade associations based in the United Kingdom
Payment systems organizations
Banking technology
2009 establishments in the United Kingdom
Organizations established in 2009